Jérôme Philippe Le Banner (born December 26, 1972) is a French kickboxer, mixed martial artist, and professional wrestler. Le Banner fought for most of his career in K-1 and became known for his aggressive fighting style and knockout power. He is a 2-time K-1 World Grand Prix runner up, a 2-time K-1 Preliminary Grand Prix champion, and is a multiple time world champion in Kickboxing and Muay Thai. He holds notable victories over Ernesto Hoost (twice), Francisco Filho, Mark Hunt (three times), Sam Greco, Mike Bernardo (twice), Peter Aerts, Rick Roufus, Remy Bonjasky, Tyrone Spong, Stefan Leko (twice), Masaaki Satake, Maurice Smith, Gary Goodridge (twice), Musashi (twice), Cyril Abidi and Choi Hong-man (twice).

Background
Jérôme Le Banner was born in the French city of Le Havre, in the région of Normandy and began training in judo at the age of five. When he was fourteen, Bruce Lee's Fist of Fury influenced him so much that he became interested in striking instead and started trying to incorporate the techniques of Jeet Kune Do he had seen in the film. At sixteen however he started practising kyokushin, while  Jeet Kune Do gave him the southpaw stance which he has maintained throughout his career, even though he is right-handed. He eventually took up Muay Thai at the age of 18. Le Banner holds a black belt in the Kyokushin Kaikan karate and in judo.

Career

Early career
At the age of 18, he debuted in his first full contact kickboxing competitions. By 19 he held the ISKA French title and soon after that, he won the European belt against Andy Mayo, and the Intercontinental belt in South Africa against Mike Bernardo. He turned down the chance to fight Richard Vince for the IKL World Kickboxing title at the age of 21.

K-1 debut
On March 3, 1995, Jerome Le Banner made his K-1 debut, winning a five-round decision over Nokweed Davy. Le Banner was at 107 kg while Nokweed was at 74 kg. Two months later, on May 4, 1995, he made his first K-1 World Grand Prix appearance in Tokyo, Japan, knocking out both Masaaki Satake and Mike Bernardo, before losing to Peter Aerts in the tournament finals.

First world title shot
After the 1995 K-1 GP, Le Banner was drafted by the French Army, and also had trouble with his trainer so he could not train for a year. His conscription ended in April 1996. He also hired a new trainer.

On June 1, 1996, in Paris, Le Banner won the ISKA Muay Thai World Super Heavyweight Championship against Curtis Schuster.

On October 18, K-1 Star Wars '96, Le Banner beat Ernesto Hoost via second-round knockout.

K-1 and boxing
During 1997 Le Banner had trouble with his trainer again. As a result, Le Banner contracted former Christophe Tiozzo's promoter Jean-Christophe Courrèges. In 1998, Le Banner contracted boxing promoter Don King and well-known boxing trainer Don Turner. He was training with Evander Holyfield.

On July 18, K-1 DREAM '98, Le Banner fought against Sam Greco. Le Banner was knocked down in the first round but managed to knock Greco out in the second round.

On September 19, Le Banner fought in Evander Holyfield vs Vaughn Bean's undercard. Le Banner beat Espedito da Silva via first-round knockout by high kick, to become WKN Muay Thai world super heavyweight champion.

Le Banner's pro boxing record was 6 fights, 6 wins, 5 KOs, 1 win by DQ. He was supposed to fight under boxing rules in the Madison Square Garden on February and March 1999, but had trouble with Don King about his contract so these matches were cancelled by King.

Return to K-1
Le Banner could not fight both kickboxing and boxing due to contract problems. In 1999, K-1 producer Kazuyoshi Ishii solved his contract problem so that he could return to K-1.

On October 3, K-1 World Grand Prix '99 Opening Round, Le Banner fought against Matt Skelton. Skelton became pro boxing WBA world Heavyweight title contender, WBO world Heavyweight number 5 contender.  Skelton had never been knocked down by punches in his fighting career but Le Banner dominated Skelton with his boxing skills and knocked out Skelton in the first round.

Matches of K-1 GP 99 final
On December 5, at the Tokyo Dome, K-1 Grand Prix '99 Final Round, Le Banner fought against three-time defending K-1 GP champion Peter Aerts in the Quarter Final. Le Banner wanted to have Aerts as his opponent in the tournament draw. Le Banner was knocked down by Aerts's high kick but managed to knock out Aerts by left hook at 1:11 of the first round. In the semifinal, Le Banner fought Ernesto Hoost. Le Banner dominated Hoost in the first round but lost by KO in the second round.

"The biggest KO of this thousand years"
On April 23, 2000, at K-1 The Millennium, Le Banner fought against Kyokushin World Open Karate Tournament 1999 champion Francisco Filho. Just 1 year before from this match, Filho had beat 1999 K-1 GP champion Ernesto Hoost by knockout. But Le Banner knocked out Filho unconscious with a left straight punch in the first round. This knock out is called "The biggest KO of this thousand years" (or the Millennium KO) by the ringside announcers and Japanese media. Le Banner's left arm and left punch have been called the "Golden Left" since this match.

On July 30, Le Banner beat Mark Hunt, Nicholas Pettas and Ernesto Hoost, to become K-1 World Grand Prix 2000 in Nagoya tournament Champion. But he was not able to fight in K-1 World Grand Prix 2000 Final due to illness from Infectious mononucleosis.

On April 29, 2001, Le Banner won the K-1 World Grand Prix tournament by three first-round KOs, the fastest win in K-1 history in a total time of 4 minutes and 4 seconds in K-1 World Grand Prix 2001 in Osaka.

On December 8, Le Banner lost to Mark Hunt by KO in K-1 World Grand Prix 2001 Final Quarter Finals. The match is one of the biggest upsets ever in K-1. After this event, Japanese combat sports magazine SRS-DX published a picture of the moment Hunt hit Le Banner's face with an elbow; however, this didn't change the match's result into disqualification.

Rubber match against Hunt in Paris
In 2002, Le Banner had begun to train with Stéphane Nikiéma.
On May 25, 2002, Le Banner fought Mark Hunt at K-1 World Grand Prix 2002 in Paris in a rubber match. In the 2nd round, first Hunt was knocked down by Le Banner's counterpunch. Le Banner was also knocked down. In the last 5 seconds of the 2nd round Le Banner knocked down Hunt with a high kick, winning by TKO.

K-1 World GP 2002 final
On December 7, 2002, at K-1 World Grand Prix 2002, after defeating Musashi in the quarterfinals, and Mark Hunt in the semis, Le Banner faced three-time World Champion Ernesto Hoost in the tournament final. Following an evenly fought first two rounds, Hoost fractured Le Banner's left arm with three round kicks in the third round. This match was stopped by 3-knock down rule. Referee Nobuaki Kakuda was severely criticized that he didn't stop the match or ask a doctor to check LeBanner when he was first knocked down. Le Banner suffered a near career-ending injury (a steel rod and eleven pins were inserted into his arm).

After broken left arm
Le Banner was able to recover and returned to the ring six months later in K-1 Paris 2003, winning the fight by punch combinations over Belarusian Vitali Akhramenko.

On March 26, 2005, Le Banner knocked Yoshihiro Akiyama out by knee kick in MMA rule at Hero's 1.

On May 13, 2006, at K-1 World Grand Prix 2006 in Amsterdam, Le Banner fought against two-time K-1 world GP champion Remy Bonjasky. The fight was rather controversial as Bonjasky won the fight in a majority decision by all Dutch judges despite being dominated in this fight. On June 30, 2006, K-1 judges admitted the decision was a mistake, and this match's result was officially changed to "Le Banner defeated Bonjasky by unanimous decision (30–29)".

In 2006, Le Banner announced that he hoped to fight against then UFC heavyweight world champion Tim Sylvia under UFC rules.

On December 2, 2006, after his loss against Semmy Schilt at K-1 World Grand Prix 2006 finals, Le Banner announced he was considering his semi retirement from tournament fighting, restricting future appearances to K-1's Superfight events.

In early 2007, after his fight at K-1 World GP 2007 in Yokohama he was forced to have knee surgery and was not expected to return to the ring until 2008; however due to a fast recovery K-1 announced that Le Banner would participate on September 29, 2007, at the K-1 World GP 2007 in Seoul Final 16 against Russian kickboxer Ruslan Karaev. Just two days before the fight, Karaev had to pull out and was replaced by a former Korean Taekwondo practitioner, Yong Soo Park. It took Le Banner only 0'54" seconds to knock out Park in the first round with a straight punch and qualify himself for the K-1 World GP 2007 Final held on December 8, 2007, held at the Yokohama Arena, Japan.

On December 8, 2007, in the ninth K-1 World GP appearance of his career, Le Banner defeated Choi Hong-man in the quarter-finals by unanimous decision before facing the reigning K-1 champion Semmy Schilt in the semis. Le Banner finished the first round up on scorecards. In the beginning of the second round Schilt landed a low kick that seemed to hurt Le Banner's right knee, on which he had surgery in early 2007. The fight was eventually stopped by Le Banner's corner throwing the towel to avoid further damage to the injured knee.

Jerome fought Schilt again at the K-1 World GP 2008 in Fukuoka for the K-1 Super-Heavyweight title. Jerome ended up losing a controversial majority decision.

As a finalist Jerome fought at the K-1 World GP 2008 Final 16 against the young Japanese fighter, Junichi Sawayashiki. Although Jerome was unable to knock the young fighter out, he won a unanimous decision. At the Finals Jerome lost by TKO to the eventual champion Remy Bonjasky when the previously broken left arm was troubling him again.

On September 26 Jerome fought Japanese rival Musashi at the K-1 World Grand Prix 2009 Final 16.  Jerome knocked down the Japanese veteran to claim a unanimous decision.
In his eleventh appearance at the K-1 World Grand Prix Final Championship he fought Semmy Schilt. Jerome lost to Semmy for the 4th time in his career by first-round TKO. After the fight, Jerome stated that he planned to continue to fight in the World Grand Prix Final even though there was suspicion before the fight that this would be his last World Grand Prix appearance.

Join Chakuriki Gym
In 2010, Le Banner announced his motivation to fight again, and joined Chakuriki Gym in Amsterdam. On April 3 at K-1 World Grand Prix 2010 in Yokohama, Le Banner beat Tyrone Spong by unanimous decision.

On July 23, during a France vs Thailand event in Stade de l'Est, Réunion, he won the W.P.M.F. Muay Thai World Super Heavyweight title, beating the Canadian Tomas Novack by KO in the fifth round.

On October 2, he fought again in the final 16 of the 2010 tournament. Le Banner fought against K-1 Heavyweight Champion Kyotaro in the opening round.  After a close three rounds where round one was called a draw, round two was given to Jerome, and round three was given to Kyotaro, the fight was sent to an extra round.  Jerome disagreed with the judges ruling on the third round and left the ring.

Le Banner fought Summer Olympic Games 2008 Judo Gold medalist Satoshi Ishii in a mixed martial arts rules bout at DREAM's Dynamite!! 2010 New Year's Eve event in Japan. LeBanner had an MMA record of 3–1–1 heading into the fight. However, LeBanner lost the fight via unanimous decision.

GLORY, WSOF and charity match of IGF Pro Wrestling for victim of Japan
In 2011, Le Banner won two new world titles in Freestyle Kickboxing rules.

On June 11, at the 8ème Nuit des Sports de Combat in Geneva, he faced for the second time the German Stefan Leko and won by unanimous decision to become the I.S.K.A. World Super Heavyweight champion.

To end the year, he fought for the first time in Pattaya, Thailand, on December 30, for the World Pro League Super Heavyweight title. Le Banner won this fight by liver kick knockout in the third round.

In parallel, he fought a Pro Wrestling charity match for victims of 2011 Tōhoku earthquake and tsunami and Fukushima Daiichi nuclear disaster at Inoki Genome Federation. He became IGF Champion and defended the title five times, before losing it to Kazuyuki Fujita on July 14, 2012. He won his six fights in Pro Wrestling by (T)KO against Shinichi Suzukawa, Erik Hammer, Kazuyuki Fujita, Montanha Silva, Josh Barnett and Tim Sylvia. On December 4, 2011, at IGF – Fighting Spirit Festival in Iwaki, Fukushima, he faced in a kickboxing charity exhibition match Japanese kickboxer Masayoshi Kakutani and won by TKO in the first round.

He began to train in MMA in the US in November 2011. He was scheduled to fight Marcin Różalski at the Main Event of the KSW 18 on February 25. However, a knee injury forced Le Banner off the card. This match was postponed for KSW 20 on September 15. But, Le Banner was again forced out of this bout due to an injured knee.

Le Banner supposed to fight GLORY 16-man tournament at Glory 4: Tokyo - 2012 Heavyweight Grand Slam in Saitama, Japan on December 31, 2012. But, his knee injury didn't recover completely for this tournament yet. So, he fought Koichi Pettas in a non-tournament bout at this event and won by Knockout in third round.

He contracted with his rival & friend Ray Sefo's organization MMA World Series of Fighting.

He rematched Koichi Pettas at Glory 8: Tokyo - 2013 65kg Slam in Tokyo, Japan on May 3, 2013, and won by unanimous decision.

Le Banner defeated Roman Kleibl via TKO due to a broken arm in round two of their contest at Time Fight 3 in Tours, France on June 15, 2013.

He was to face James Smith at Fight Night Saint Tropez in Saint-Tropez, France on August 4, 2013 but Smith was replaced by Vitali Akhramenko. Le Banner knocked Akhramenko out in round two for the W.K.N. Kickboxing Oriental World Super Heavyweight title.

He was set to fight Sergei Kharitonov at Glory 10: Los Angeles – 2013 85kg Slam in Ontario, California, United States on September 28, 2013 but withdrew after suffering a neck injury.

Le Banner knocked out Zinedine Hameur-Lain in round two at La 20ème Nuit des Champions in Marseille, France on November 23, 2013.

The Sergei Kharitonov fight was rescheduled for Glory 13: Tokyo - Welterweight World Championship Tournament in Tokyo, Japan on December 21, 2013. Le Banner lost by unanimous decision.

He beat Lucian Danilencu via second-round KO at Final Fight – Retour aux sources in Le Havre, France on May 30, 2014.

He defeated Colin George at Fight Night Saint-Tropez II in Saint-Tropez, France on August 4, 2014.

Le Banner returned at Mixed Martial Arts Grand Prix: The Last of Kings on June 4, 2022, to face Ivan Vičić in a MMA bout. He won the fight via a rear-naked choke submission in the first round.

Championships and accomplishments

Kickboxing and Muay thai
World Kickboxing Network
2015 W.K.N. Kickboxing Oriental World Super Heavyweight Champion (current)
2013 W.K.N. Kickboxing Oriental World Super Heavyweight Champion (third title defence)
2012 W.K.N. Kickboxing Oriental World Super Heavyweight Champion (second title defence)
2005 W.K.N. Muaythai World Super Heavyweight Champion (first title defence)
1998 W.K.N. Muaythai World Super Heavyweight Champion
International Sport Karate Association
2015 I.S.K.A. K1 rules World Super Heavyweight title (current)
2011 I.S.K.A. Freestyle Kickboxing World Super Heavyweight Champion (current)
2000 I.S.K.A. Muaythai World Super Heavyweight Champion (third title defence)
2000 I.S.K.A. Muaythai World Super Heavyweight Champion (second title defence)
1997 I.S.K.A. Muaythai World Super Heavyweight Champion (first title defence)
1996 I.S.K.A. Muaythai World Super Heavyweight Champion
1994 I.S.K.A. Full Contact Intercontinental Super Heavyweight Champion
1994 I.S.K.A. Full Contact European Super Heavyweight Champion
1992 I.S.K.A. Full Contact French Super Heavyweight Champion
World Pro League Kickboxing 
2011 World Pro League Kickboxing Super Heavyweight Champion (current)
World Professional Muaythai Federation
2010 W.P.M.F. Muaythai World Super Heavyweight Champion
K-1
2007 K-1 World Grand Prix Final third place
2002 K-1 World Grand Prix Final Runner Up
2001 K-1 World Grand Prix in Osaka Champion
2000 K-1 World Grand Prix in Nagoya Champion
1999 K-1 World Grand Prix Final 3rd Place
1995 K-1 World Grand Prix Final Runner Up
RCFA
1994 R.C.F.A. World Super Heavyweight Champion
FFUBADA
1992 FFUBADA French Cup Full Contact Champion (−91 kg) in Paris
1990 FFUBADA Full Contact French Junior Champion in Gymnase Japy, Paris

Awards
2009 Pantheon of Sports and Martial Arts] Hall of Fame in Tokyo, Japan
2007 K-1 World GP 2007 Final MVP and best fight of the tournament versus Choi Hong-man
1999 Fuji Television Best fight of the K-1 World GP 1999 Final versus Peter Aerts
1997 Fuji Television and Special Ringside Magazine Best fight of the K-1 Grand Prix '97 first round in Osaka versus Rick Roufus
1997 Gold Katana of the best Muaythai fighter at 12th Martial arts Festival, Paris, Bercy

Professional wrestling
Inoki Genome Federation
IGF Championship (1 time, inaugural)

Kickboxing record

|-  style="background:#cfc;"
| 2019-12-15 || Win ||align=left| Viacheslav Datsik || World Cup TNA Fights || Kazan, Russia || KO (Left Middle Kick) || 2 ||  || 86–22–2–1
|-  style="background:#cfc;"
| 2019-07-28 || Win ||align=left| Jun Soo Lim || HEAT 45 || Nagoya, Japan || KO || 2 || 2:15 || 85–22–2–1
|-  style="background:#cfc;"
| 2019-04-19 || Win ||align=left| Adnan Alic || Bulldog Media Fight Night 2.0 || Göteborg, Sweden || TKO || 1 || 2:02 || 84–22–2–1
|-  style="background:#cfc;"
| 2019-03-02 || Win ||align=left| Jairo Kusunoki || HEAT 44 || Nagoya, Japan || KO (Low kicks) || 2 || 2:47 || 83–22–2–1
|-  style="background:#cfc;"
| 2018-10-27 || Win ||align=left| Wojciech Buliński || Fight Legend Geneva || Geneva, Switzerland || TKO (Ref. Stop/3 Knockdowns) || 1 ||   || 82–22–2–1
|-  style="background:#cfc;"
| 2015-08-04 || Win ||align=left| Karl Roberson || Fight Night Saint-Tropez III || Saint Tropez, France || Decision (unanimous) || 5 || 2:00 || 81–22–2–1
|-
! style=background:white colspan=9 |
|-  style="background:#cfc;"
| 2015-04-25 || Win ||align=left| Claudiu Istrate || Final Fight 2 || Évreux, France || KO (left knee to the body) || 2 || 0:53 || 80–22–2–1
|-
! style=background:white colspan=9 |
|-  bgcolor="#CCFFCC"
| 2014-08-04 || Win ||align=left| Colin George || Fight Night Saint-Tropez II || Saint-Tropez, France || KO (Left Liver Kick) || 2 || 0:23 || 79–22–2–1
|-
|-  bgcolor="#CCFFCC"
| 2014-05-30 || Win  ||align=left| Lucian Danilencu || Final Fight – Retour aux sources || Le Havre, France || KO (right hook to the body) || 2 || 0:48 || 78–22–2–1
|-
|-  bgcolor="#ffbbbb"
| 2013-12-21 || Loss ||align=left| Sergei Kharitonov || Glory 13: Tokyo || Tokyo, Japan || Decision (unanimous) || 3 || 3:00 || 77–22–2–1
|-
|-  bgcolor="#CCFFCC"
| 2013-11-23 || Win ||align=left| Zinedine Hameur-Lain || La 20ème Nuit des Champions || Marseilles, France || KO (Right body shot) || 2 || 0:40 || 77–21–2–1
|-
|-  bgcolor="#CCFFCC"
| 2013-08-04 || Win ||align=left| Vitali Akhramenko || Fight Night Saint-Tropez || Saint-Tropez, France || TKO (Ref. Stop/Right Low Kick) || 2 || 1:42 || 76–21–2–1
|-
! style=background:white colspan=9 |
|-
|-  bgcolor="#CCFFCC"
| 2013-06-15 || Win ||align=left| Roman Kleibl || Time Fight 3 || Tours, France || TKO (Ref. Stop/Left Middle Kick) || 2 || 1:00 || 75–21–2–1
|-
|-  bgcolor="#CCFFCC"
| 2013-05-03 || Win ||align=left| Koichi Watanabe || Glory 8: Tokyo || Tokyo, Japan || Decision (unanimous) || 3 || 3:00 || 74–21–2–1
|-
|-  bgcolor="#CCFFCC"
| 2012-12-31 || Win ||align=left| Koichi Watanabe || Glory 4: Tokyo || Saitama, Japan || KO (right hook) || 3 || 2:48 || 73–21–2–1
|-
|-  bgcolor="#c5d2ea"
| 2012-04-28 || Draw ||align=left| Arnold Oborotov || Le Banner Series Acte 1 || Geneva, Switzerland || Decision Draw || 5 || 2:00 || 72–21–2–1
|-
! style=background:white colspan=9 |
|-
|-  bgcolor="#ffbbbb"
| 2012-03-23 || Loss ||align=left| Errol Zimmerman || United Glory 15 || Moscow, Russia || TKO (3 Knockdowns Rule) || 1 || 2:21 || 72–21–1–1
|-  bgcolor="#CCFFCC"
| 2011-12-30 || Win ||align=left| Andrei Kirsanov || Gladiator's War – Le Banner Tour – First Fight || Pattaya, Thailand || KO (Liver kick) || 3 || 1:19 || 72–20–1–1
|-
! style=background:white colspan=9 |
|-
|-  bgcolor="#CCFFCC"
| 2011-12-04 || Ex ||align=left| Masayoshi Kakutani || IGF – Fighting Spirit Festival in Iwaki, Exhibition match || Iwaki, Japan || TKO (Ref stop/3 Knockdowns) || 1 || 2:19 ||
|-
|-  bgcolor="#CCFFCC"
| 2011-06-11 || Win ||align=left| Stefan Leko || 8ème Nuit des Sports de Combat || Geneva, Switzerland || Decision (Unanimous) || 5 || 2:00 || 71–20–1–1
|-
! style=background:white colspan=9 |
|-
|-  bgcolor="#ffbbbb"
| 2010-10-02 || Loss ||align=left| Kyotaro Fujimoto  || K-1 World Grand Prix 2010 in Seoul Final 16 || Seoul, South Korea || Forfeit || 4 || 0:00 || 70–20–1–1
|-
! style=background:white colspan=9 |
|-
|-  bgcolor="#CCFFCC"
| 2010-07-23 || Win ||align=left| Tomas Novack || Muay-Thaï France vs Thaïland || Stade de l'Est, Réunion || KO (Right hook) || 5 || 2:56 || 70–19–1–1
|-
! style=background:white colspan=9 |
|-
|-  bgcolor="#CCFFCC"
| 2010-04-03 || Win ||align=left| Tyrone Spong || K-1 World Grand Prix 2010 in Yokohama ||Yokohama, Japan || Decision (Unanimous) || 3 || 3:00 || 69–19–1–1
|-  bgcolor="#ffbbbb"
| 2009-12-05 || Loss ||align=left| Semmy Schilt || K-1 World Grand Prix 2009 Final Quarter Finals || Yokohama, Japan || TKO (Left Front Kick) || 1 || 1:27 || 68–19–1–1
|-  bgcolor="#CCFFCC"
| 2009-09-26 || Win ||align=left| Musashi || K-1 World Grand Prix 2009 Final 16 || Seoul, South Korea || Decision (Unanimous) || 3 || 3:00 || 68–18–1–1
|-
! style=background:white colspan=9 |
|-
|-  bgcolor="#ffbbbb"
| 2009-03-28 || Loss ||align=left| Ewerton Teixeira || K-1 World GP 2009 in Yokohama || Yokohama, Japan || 2 Ext R. Decision (Split) || 5 || 3:00 || 67–18–1–1
|-  bgcolor="#ffbbbb"
| 2008-12-06 || Loss ||align=left| Remy Bonjasky || K-1 World GP 2008 Final Quarter Finals || Yokohama, Japan || TKO (Arm injury) || 3 || 1:56 || 67–17–1–1
|-  bgcolor="#CCFFCC"
| 2008-09-27 || Win ||align=left| Junichi Sawayashiki || K-1 World GP 2008 Final 16 || Seoul, Korea || Decision (Unanimous) || 3 || 3:00 || 67–16–1–1
|-
! style=background:white colspan=9 |
|-
|-  bgcolor="#ffbbbb"
| 2008-06-29 || Loss ||align=left| Semmy Schilt || K-1 World GP 2008 in Fukuoka || Fukuoka, Japan || Decision (Majority) || 3 || 3:00 || 66–16–1–1
|-
! style=background:white colspan=9 |
|-
|-  bgcolor="#ffbbbb"
| 2007-12-08 || Loss ||align=left| Semmy Schilt || K-1 World GP 2007 Final Semi Finals || Yokohama, Japan || TKO (Leg injury) || 2 || 1:02 || 66–15–1–1
|-  bgcolor="#CCFFCC"
| 2007-12-08 || Win ||align=left| Choi Hong-man || K-1 World GP 2007 Final Quarter Finals || Yokohama, Japan || Decision (Unanimous) || 3 || 3:00 || 66–14–1–1
|-  bgcolor="#CCFFCC"
| 2007-09-29 || Win ||align=left| Yong Soo Park || K-1 World GP 2007 in Seoul Final 16 || Seoul, Korea || KO (Right punch) || 1 || 0:54 || 65–14–1–1
|-
! style=background:white colspan=9 |
|-
|-  bgcolor="#ffbbbb"
| 2007-03-04 || Loss ||align=left| Junichi Sawayashiki || K-1 World GP 2007 in Yokohama || Yokohama, Japan || Decision (Unanimous) || 3 || 3:00 || 64–14–1–1
|-  bgcolor="#ffbbbb"
| 2006-12-02 || Loss ||align=left| Semmy Schilt || K-1 World Grand Prix 2006 Quarter Finals || Tokyo, Japan || Decision (Unanimous) || 3 || 3:00 || 64–13–1–1
|-  bgcolor="#CCFFCC"
| 2006-09-30 || Win ||align=left| Choi Hong-man || K-1 World Grand Prix 2006 in Osaka Opening Round || Osaka, Japan || Ext.R Decision (Unanimous) || 4 || 3:00 || 64–12–1–1
|-
! style=background:white colspan=9 |
|-
|-  bgcolor="#CCFFCC"
| 2006-05-13 || Win ||align=left| Remy Bonjasky || K-1 World Grand Prix 2006 in Amsterdam || Amsterdam, Netherlands || Decision (Unanimous) || 3 || 3:00 || 63–12–1–1
|-  bgcolor="#ffbbbb"
| 2005-11-19 || Loss ||align=left| Peter Aerts || K-1 World Grand Prix 2005 Quarter Finals || Tokyo, Japan || Ext.R Decision (Unanimous) || 4 || 3:00 || 62–12–1–1
|-  bgcolor="#CCFFCC"
| 2005-09-23 || Win ||align=left|Gary Goodridge || K-1 World Grand Prix 2005 in Osaka - Final Elimination || Osaka, Japan || TKO (Three knockdowns) || 1 || 2:13 || 62–11–1–1
|-
! style=background:white colspan=9 |
|-
|-  bgcolor="#CCFFCC"
| 2005-07-02 || Win ||align=left| Dimitry Podgaisky || Le Grand Tournoi 2005 || Paris, France || KO (Right hook) || 1 || 1:49 || 61–11–1–1
|-  bgcolor="#CCFFCC"
| 2005-05-27 || Win ||align=left| Cyril Abidi || K-1 World Grand Prix 2005 in Paris || Paris, France || TKO (Referee stoppage) || 5 || 2:53 || 60–11–1–1
|-  bgcolor="#CCFFCC"
| 2005-04-30 || Win ||align=left| Oliver van Damme || Post Tenebra Cup 2005 || Geneva, Switzerland || KO (Left hook) || 1 || 2:07 || 59–11–1–1
|-
! style=background:white colspan=9 |
|-
|-  bgcolor="#CCFFCC"
| 2004-12-04 || Win ||align=left| Hiromi Amada || K-1 World Grand Prix 2004 || Tokyo, Japan || KO (Low kicks) || 2 || 1:03 || 58–11–1–1
|-  bgcolor="#ffbbbb"
| 2004-09-25 || Loss ||align=left| Francois Botha || K-1 World Grand Prix 2004 Final Elimination || Tokyo, Japan ||  (Forfeit injury) || 3 || 3:00 || 57–11–1–1
|-
! style=background:white colspan=9 |
|-
|-  bgcolor="#CCFFCC"
| 2004-07-17 || Win ||align=left| Terrence Reasby || K-1 World Grand Prix 2004 in Seoul || Seoul, Korea || KO (Knee strike) || 1 || 0:53 || 57–10–1–1
|-  bgcolor="#CCFFCC"
| 2003-09-21 || Win ||align=left| Shaka Zulu || K-1 Survival 2003 Japan Grand Prix Final || Yokohama, Japan || KO (Right low kick) || 2 || 1:10 || 56–10–1–1
|-  bgcolor="#CCFFCC"
| 2003-06-14 || Win ||align=left| Vitali Akhramenko || K-1 World Grand Prix 2003 in Paris || Paris, France || KO (Right punch) || 2 || 0:28 || 55–10–1–1
|-  bgcolor="#ffbbbb"
| 2002-12-07 || Loss ||align=left| Ernesto Hoost || K-1 World Grand Prix 2002 Final Final || Tokyo, Japan || KO (Right mid-kicks) || 3 || 1:26 || 54–10–1–1
|-
! style=background:white colspan=9 |
|-
|-  bgcolor="#CCFFCC"
| 2002-12-07 || Win ||align=left| Mark Hunt || K-1 World Grand Prix 2002 Final Semi Finals || Tokyo, Japan || Decision || 3 || 3:00 || 54–9–1–1
|-  bgcolor="#CCFFCC"
| 2002-12-07 || Win ||align=left| Musashi || K-1 World Grand Prix 2002 Final Quarter Finals || Tokyo, Japan || KO (Punches) || 2 || 0:51 || 53–9–1–1
|-  bgcolor="#CCFFCC"
| 2002-10-05 || Win ||align=left| Gary Goodridge || K-1 World Grand Prix 2002 Final Elimination || Tokyo, Japan || KO (Right jab) || 1 || 0:42 || 52–9–1–1
|-
! style=background:white colspan=9 |
|-
|-  bgcolor="#CCFFCC"
| 2002-08-28 || Win ||align=left| Don Frye || PRIDE Shockwave || Tokyo, Japan || KO (Right hook) || 1 || 1:30 || 51–9–1–1
|-  bgcolor="#CCFFCC"
| 2002-07-06 || Win ||align=left| Sinisa Andrijasevic || ISKA Championship Kickboxing || Paris, France || TKO (Corner stoppage) || 4 || 2:00 || 50–9–1–1
|-  bgcolor="#CCFFCC"
| 2002-05-25 || Win ||align=left| Mark Hunt || K-1 World Grand Prix 2002 in Paris || Paris, France || TKO (Corner stoppage) || 2 || 3:00 || 49–9–1–1
|-  bgcolor="#CCFFCC"
| 2002-03-03 || Win ||align=left| Hiromi Amada || K-1 World Grand Prix 2002 in Nagoya || Nagoya, Japan || KO (Right punch) || 1 || 1:42 || 48–9–1–1
|-  bgcolor="#ffbbbb"
| 2001-12-08 || Loss ||align=left| Mark Hunt || K-1 World Grand Prix 2001 Final Quarter Finals || Tokyo, Japan || KO (Right hook) || 2 || 2:32 || 47–9–1–1
|-  bgcolor="#CCFFCC"
| 2001-08-19 || Win ||align=left| Marc de Wit || K-1 Andy Memorial 2001 Japan GP Final || Saitama, Japan || KO (Right cross) || 2 || 1:45 || 47–8–1–1
|-  bgcolor="#CCFFCC"
| 2001-06-24 || Win ||align=left| Stefan Leko || K-1 Survival 2001 || Sendai, Japan || Decision || 5 || 3:00 || 46–8–1–1
|-  bgcolor="#CCFFCC"
| 2001-04-29 || Win ||align=left| Adam Watt || K-1 World Grand Prix 2001 in Osaka Final || Osaka, Japan || KO (Punch rush) || 1 || 0:46 || 45–8–1–1
|-
! style=background:white colspan=9 |
|-
|-  bgcolor="#CCFFCC"
| 2001-04-29 || Win ||align=left| Ebenezer Braga || K-1 World Grand Prix 2001 in Osaka Semi Finals || Osaka, Japan || KO (Left punch) || 1 || 1:03 || 44–8–1–1
|-  bgcolor="#CCFFCC"
| 2001-04-29 || Win ||align=left| Pavel Majer || K-1 World Grand Prix 2001 in Osaka Quarter Finals || Osaka, Japan || KO (Left punch) || 1 || 2:15 || 43–8–1–1
|-  bgcolor="#c5d2ea"
| 2001-03-17 || NC ||align=left| Mike Bernardo || K-1 Gladiators 2001 || Yokohama, Japan || No Contest || 1 || 3:00 || 42–8–1–1
|-  bgcolor="#CCFFCC"
| 2001-03-02 || Win ||align=left| Andrei Zuravkov || Double Shock Power || Marseilles, France || TKO (Referee Stoppage) || 2 ||   || 42–8–1
|-  bgcolor="#CCFFCC"
| 2000-07-30 || Win ||align=left| Ernesto Hoost || K-1 World Grand Prix 2000 in Nagoya Final || Nagoya, Japan || TKO (Corner stoppage) || 1 || 3:00 || 41–8–1
|-
! style=background:white colspan=9 |
|-
|-  bgcolor="#CCFFCC"
| 2000-07-30 || Win ||align=left| Nicholas Pettas || K-1 World Grand Prix 2000 in Nagoya Semi Finals || Nagoya, Japan || TKO (Left Hook, 2 Knockdown Rule) || 1 || 3:00 || 40–8–1
|-  bgcolor="#CCFFCC"
| 2000-07-30 || Win ||align=left| Mark Hunt || K-1 World Grand Prix 2000 in Nagoya Quarter Finals || Nagoya, Japan || Decision (Unanimous) || 3 || 3:00 || 39–8–1
|-  bgcolor="#CCFFCC"
| 2000-07-13 || Win ||align=left| Shaun Johnson || ISKA Championship || Las Vegas, NV || KO (Left straight cross) || 1 || 1:30 || 38–8–1
|-
! style=background:white colspan=9 |
|-
|-  bgcolor="#CCFFCC"
| 2000-05-28 || Win ||align=left| Jan Nortje || K-1 Survival 2000 || Sapporo, Japan || KO (Left hook) || 1 || 1:07 || 37–8–1
|-  bgcolor="#CCFFCC"
| 2000-04-23 || Win ||align=left| Francisco Filho || K-1 The Millennium || Osaka, Japan || KO (Left straight cross) || 1 || 2:02 || 36–8–1
|-  bgcolor="#CCFFCC"
| 2000-03-18 || Win ||align=left| Paris Vassilikos || I.S.K.A. Championship || Las Vegas, NV || KO (Right hook) || 2 || 1:09 || 35–8–1
|-
! style=background:white colspan=9 |
|-
|-  bgcolor="#ffbbbb"
| 1999-12-05 || Loss ||align=left| Ernesto Hoost || K-1 World Grand Prix 1999 Semi Finals || Tokyo, Japan || KO (Right hook) || 2 || 0:26 || 34–8–1
|-  bgcolor="#CCFFCC"
| 1999-12-05 || Win ||align=left| Peter Aerts || K-1 World Grand Prix 1999 Quarter Finals || Tokyo, Japan || KO (Left hook) || 1 || 1:11 || 34–7–1
|-  bgcolor="#CCFFCC"
| 1999-10-03 || Win ||align=left| Matt Skelton || K-1 World Grand Prix '99 Opening Round || Osaka, Japan || KO (Right hook) || 1 || 1:59 || 33–7–1
|-
! style=background:white colspan=9 |
|-  bgcolor="#CCFFCC"
| 1999-02-27 || Win ||align=left| Rob van Esdonk || Les Stars Du Ring  || Marseilles, France || KO (Left hook) || 1 || 2:28 || 32–7–1
|-  bgcolor="#CCFFCC"
| 1998-09-19 || Win ||align=left| Espedito da Silva || WKN World Championship Kickboxing || Atlanta, GA || KO (Left High Kick) || 1 || 0:52 || 31–7–1
|-
! style=background:white colspan=9 |
|-
|-  bgcolor="#CCFFCC"
| 1998-07-18 || Win ||align=left| Sam Greco || K-1 Dream '98 || Nagoya, Japan || KO (Right hook) || 2 || 2:07 || 30–7–1
|-  bgcolor="#CCFFCC"
| 1998-05-24 || Win ||align=left| Zijad Poljo || K-1 Braves '98 || Fukuoka, Japan || TKO (Ref. Stop/Left cross) || 3 || 2:52 || 29–7–1
|-  bgcolor="#ffbbbb"
| 1997-11-09 || Loss ||align=left| Ernesto Hoost || K-1 Grand Prix '97 Quarter Finals || Tokyo, Japan || KO (Right hook) || 1 || 1:15 || 28–7–1
|-  bgcolor="#CCFFCC"
| 1997-09-07 || Win ||align=left| Rick Roufus || K-1 Grand Prix '97 First Round || Osaka, Japan || TKO (Ref. Stop/Left High Kick) || 3 || 2:05 || 28–6–1
|-
! style=background:white colspan=9 |
|-
|-  bgcolor="#ffbbbb"
| 1997-07-20 || Loss ||align=left| Peter Aerts || K-1 Dream '97 || Nagoya, Japan || KO (Right High Kick) || 2 || 1:19 || 27–6–1
|-  bgcolor="#ffbbbb"
| 1997-04-29 || Loss ||align=left| Ray Sefo || K-1 Braves '97 || Fukuoka, Japan || KO (Right Hook) || 1 || 1:31 || 27–5–1
|-  bgcolor=
| 1997-04-20 || Ex ||align=left| Stéphane Reveillon || 12th Martial arts Festival || Paris-Bercy, France || No Decision || 3 ||  ||
|-  bgcolor="#CCFFCC"
| 1997-02-01 || Win ||align=left| Maurice Smith || Le Choc des Champions || Paris, France || Decision || 5 || 3:00 || 27–4–1
|-
! style=background:white colspan=9 |
|-
|-  bgcolor="#c5d2ea"
| 1996-12-08 || Draw ||align=left| Sam Greco || K-1 Hercules '96 || Nagoya, Japan || Decision Draw || 5 || 3:00 || 26–4–1
|-  bgcolor="#CCFFCC"
| 1996-10-18 || Win ||align=left| Ernesto Hoost || K-1 Star Wars '96 || Yokohama, Japan || TKO (Right Hook) || 2 || 2:57 || 26–4
|-  bgcolor="#CCFFCC"
| 1996-09-01 || Win ||align=left| Takeru || K-1 Revenge '96 || Osaka, Japan || KO (Right cross) || 4 || 2:49 || 25–4
|-  bgcolor="#CCFFCC"
| 1996-06-01 || Win ||align=left| Curtis Schuster || Le Choc des Champions || Paris, France || Decision || 5 || 3:00 || 24–4
|-
! style=background:white colspan=9 |
|-
|-  bgcolor="#ffbbbb"
| 1996-03-10 || Loss ||align=left| Mirko Filipović || K-1 Grand Prix '96 Opening Battle || Yokohama, Japan || Decision (Unanimous) || 5 || 3:00 || 23–4
|-
! style=background:white colspan=9|
|-
|-  style="background:#cfc;"
| 1996-01-19 || Win ||align=left| Willy Martina || Muaythai Gala in Paris || Levallois-Perret, France || KO (Left Low Kick) || 1 || 2:33 || 23–3
|-  style="background:#fbb;"
| 1995-12-09 || Loss ||align=left| Andy Hug || K-1 Hercules || Nagoya, Japan || Decision (Unanimous) || 5 || 3:00 || 22–3
|-  style="background:#cfc;"
| 1995-09-03 || Win ||align=left| John Kleijn || K-1 Revenge II || Yokohama, Japan || KO (Right hook) || 2 || 1:10 || 22–2
|-  style="background:#fbb;"
| 1995-05-04 || Loss ||align=left| Peter Aerts || K-1 Grand Prix '95 Final || Tokyo, Japan || KO (Right body shot) || 1 || 1:37 || 21–2
|-
! style=background:white colspan=9 |
|-  style="background:#cfc;"
| 1995-05-04 || Win ||align=left| Mike Bernardo || K-1 Grand Prix '95 Semi Finals || Tokyo, Japan || KO (Right low kick) || 2 || 3:05 || 21–1
|-  style="background:#cfc;"
| 1995-05-04 || Win ||align=left| Masaaki Satake || K-1 Grand Prix '95 Quarter Finals || Tokyo, Japan || KO (Left straight punch) || 3 || 2:32 || 20–1
|-  style="background:#cfc;"
| 1995-03-03 || Win ||align=left| Nokweed Davy||K-1 Grand Prix '95 Opening Battle || Tokyo, Japan || Decision (unanimous) || 5 || 3:00 || 19–1
|-
! style=background:white colspan=9|
|-  style="background:#cfc;"
| 1994-12-10 || Win ||align=left| Willy Martina || Full Contact Gala ||  || Decision ||  ||  || 
|-  style="background:#cfc;"
| 1994-00-00 || Win ||align=left| Andre Buan Buaren || R.C.F.A. World Super Heavyweight Championship || Johannesburg, South Africa || KO ||  ||   || 
|-
! style=background:white colspan=9|
|-  style="background:#cfc;"
| 1994-10-00 || Win ||align=left| Mike Bernardo || I.S.K.A. Full-Contact Intercontinental Championship || Cape Town, South Africa || Decision (3–0) || 10 || 2:00  || 
|-
! style=background:white colspan=9|
|-  style="background:#cfc;"
| 1994-04-16 || Win ||align=left| Andy Mayo || I.S.K.A. Full-Contact European Championship || Elbeuf, France || KO (Left Highkick) || 1 ||  || 11–1
|-
! style=background:white colspan=9|
|-  style="background:#cfc;"
| 1993-06-07 || Win ||align=left| Claude Herman || Full-Contact gala in La Locomotive Discothèque || Paris, France || KO || 1 ||  || 
|-  style="background:#cfc;"
| 1993-04-24 || Win ||align=left| Cunningham || Full Contact Gala : France vs The World || Elbeuf, France || TKO (Referee Stoppage) || 2 ||  || 
|-  style="background:#cfc;"
| 1992-12-06 || Win ||align=left| Raynald Fucho || I.S.K.A. Full-Contact French Championship || Le Havre, France || Decision || 7 || 2:00 || 
|-
! style=background:white colspan=9|
|-  style="background:#cfc;"
| 1992-11-13 || Win ||align=left| Stéphane Reveillon || La Nuit des Champions || Marseilles, France || KO (Right Hook) || 2 ||  || 
|-  style="background:#fbb;"
| 1992-05-30 || Loss ||align=left| Saïd Bechari || Full Contact Gala || Valence, Drôme, France || (T)KO || 1 ||  || 
|-  style="background:#cfc;"
| 1992-01-19 || Win ||align=left| Joly || FFUBADA French Cup, Final || Paris, France ||  ||  ||  || 
|-
! style=background:white colspan=9|
|-

|-  style="background:#cfc;"
| 2009-11-13 || Win ||align=left| Ladislav Kovarik || Deauville Casino || Deauville, Calvados, France || KO || 2 ||  || 6–0
|-  style="background:#cfc;"
| 2009-05-23 || Win ||align=left| Werner Kreiskott || Deauville Casino || Deauville, Calvados, France || TKO || 4 || 1:59 || 5–0
|-  style="background:#cfc;"
| 1998-11-14 || Win ||align=left| Ferenc Deák || L'Espace François Mitterrand || Mont-de-Marsan, France || DQ || 2 || || 4–0
|-  style="background:#cfc;"
| 1998-06-20 || Win ||align=left| James Henderson || The Moon Nightclub || Tallahassee, FL || KO || 4 || 0:37 || 3–0
|-  style="background:#cfc;"
| 1998-04-10 || Win ||align=left| Jerry Reynolds || || United States || TKO || 1 || || 2–0
|-  style="background:#cfc;"
| 1998-02-24 || Win ||align=left| Tudor Panait || || Oporto, Portugal || TKO || 4 || || 1–0
|-

Mixed martial arts record

|-
|Win
|align=center|6–3
|Adnan Alić
|TKO (ground and pound)
|MMA GP: Évolution
|
|align=center|1
|align=center|1:38
|Paris, France
|
|-
|  Win
|align=center|5–3
|Ivan Vičić
|Submission (rear-naked choke)
|MMA Grand Prix: The Last of Kings
|
|align=center|1
|align=center|2:06
|Le Havre, France
|
|-
|  Win
|align=center|4–3
|Chang Hee Kim 
|TKO (punch)
|HEAT 46
|
|align=center|1
|align=center|0:50
|Tokyo, Japan
|
|-
|  Loss
|align=center|3–3
| Roque Martinez
| Submission (scarf-hold headlock)
| Rizin World Grand Prix 2017: Opening Round – Part 2
| 
| align=center| 1
| align=center| 5:10
| Fukuoka, Japan
|
|-
|  Loss
|align=center|3–2
|Satoshi Ishii 
|Decision (unanimous)
|Dynamite!! 2010
|
|align=center|3
|align=center|5:00
|Saitama, Saitama, Japan
|
|-
|  Win
|align=center|3–1
|Jimmy Ambriz 
|KO (punch)
|K-1 Hero's 4
|
|align=center|1
|align=center|2:04
|Tokyo, Japan
|
|-
|  Win
|align=center|2–1
|Alan Karaev 
|TKO (body kick)
|K-1 PREMIUM 2005 Dynamite!! 
|
|align=center|2
|align=center|1:14
|Osaka, Japan
|
|-
|  Win
|align=center|1–1
|Yoshihiro Akiyama 
|KO (knees)
|K-1 Hero's 1
|
|align=center|1
|align=center|2:24
|Saitama, Saitama, Japan
|
|-
|  Loss
|align=center|0–1
|Tadao Yasuda
|Submission (forearm choke)
|Inoki Bom-Ba-Ye 2001
|
|align=center|2
|align=center|2:50
|Saitama, Saitama, Japan
|

Mixed rules record

|-
| Draw
|align=center| 0–0–1
|Bob Sapp 
|Draw
|K-1 PREMIUM 2004 Dynamite!!
|
|align=center| 3
|align=center| 3:00
|Tokyo, Japan
|

Filmography

See also
List of K-1 events
List of K-1 champions
List of male kickboxers

References

External links

 

Profile at K-1

1972 births
Living people
French male boxers
Heavyweight boxers
French male kickboxers
Heavyweight kickboxers
French male mixed martial artists
Heavyweight mixed martial artists
French male karateka
Super heavyweight mixed martial artists
Mixed martial artists utilizing Muay Thai
Mixed martial artists utilizing Kyokushin kaikan
Mixed martial artists utilizing judo
Mixed martial artists utilizing Jeet Kune Do
Mixed martial artists utilizing kickboxing
Mixed martial artists utilizing Wing Chun
French Muay Thai practitioners
French Wing Chun practitioners
French male judoka
French people of Breton descent
French people of Belgian descent
Mixed martial arts trainers
French expatriate sportspeople in the Netherlands
Sportspeople from Le Havre